Ashti Bolagh (also Romanized as Āshtī Bolāgh) is a village in Chaharduli Rural District, Keshavarz District, Shahin Dezh County, West Azerbaijan Province, Iran. At the 2006 census, its population was 81, in 20 families.

References 

Populated places in Shahin Dezh County